Louis Lombardo (November 18, 1928 – June 11, 2001) was a Major League Baseball pitcher who played in two games for the New York Giants in .

External links

1928 births
2001 deaths
Baseball players from New Jersey
Bristol Twins players
Danville Leafs players
Jacksonville Tars players
Little Rock Travelers players
Major League Baseball pitchers
Manchester Giants players
Minneapolis Millers (baseball) players
Minot Mallards players
Montgomery Rebels players
New York Giants (NL) players
Oklahoma City Indians players
People from Carlstadt, New Jersey
Sportspeople from Bergen County, New Jersey
Toledo Mud Hens players
Trenton Giants players
Tyler Tigers players